Albhy Galuten (born Alan Bruce Galuten; December 27, 1947) is an American technology executive and futurist, Grammy Award-winning record producer, composer, musician, orchestrator and conductor. He has numerous inventions and has produced 18 number 1 singles with songs and albums selling over 100,000,000 copies. He has won two Grammy Awards, a Dramalogue award, and a BMI Citation of Achievement.

Career

Musical career 
Galuten attended Berklee College of Music.

Galuten's record productions include the soundtracks Saturday Night Fever, the theme song "Grease," the Eric Clapton recording of "Knockin on Heaven's Door" and albums for Jellyfish, Olivia Newton-John, Barbra Streisand (Guilty), Dionne Warwick (Heartbreaker), Andy Gibb, Kenny Rogers and Dolly Parton, Samantha Sang, Diana Ross, Eric Clapton, Jesse Ed Davis, Titanic Love Affair and the Bee Gees. He also formed a production team with Barry Gibb and Karl Richardson under the name Gibb-Galuten-Richardson.

Galuten also contributed playing or orchestration skills to recording artists Wishbone Ash, Bill Wyman, Eric Clapton, Rod Stewart, Aretha Franklin, Eagles, Kenny Loggins, Petula Clark and No Doubt. He is also credited with playing the first synthesizer in reggae.

His US singles include 13 number ones:
 "You Should Be Dancing" - Bee Gees
 "I Just Want to Be Your Everything" - Andy Gibb
 "How Deep Is Your Love" - Bee Gees
 "Stayin' Alive" - Bee Gees
 "(Love Is) Thicker Than Water" - Andy Gibb
 "Night Fever" - Bee Gees
 "Shadow Dancing" - Andy Gibb
 "Grease" - Frankie Valli
 "Too Much Heaven" - Bee Gees
 "Tragedy" - Bee Gees
 "Love You Inside Out" - Bee Gees
 "Woman in Love" - Barbra Streisand
 "Islands in the Stream" - Kenny Rogers with Dolly Parton
Other hit singles include "Knockin’ on Heaven’s Door" (Eric Clapton), "Love So Right" (Bee Gees), Guilty (Barbra Streisand), "What Kind of Fool" (Barbra Streisand), "Emotion" (Samantha Sang), "I Can't Help It" (Olivia Newton-John & Andy Gibb), "Heartbreaker" (Dionne Warwick), "Chain Reaction" (Diana Ross), "Eaten Alive" (Diana Ross), "Eyes That See In the Dark"  (Kenny Rogers)

Technology executive 
He is currently a Founder at Agora and a Senior Fellow, Technology Initiatives at Intertrust Technologies. He has been a vice president at Sony and a Senior Vice President at Universal Music Group and a vice president at Ion. In his various roles as a technology executive, Galuten has filed patents, developed corporate technology strategy, negotiated technology deals and worked in the development of standards including the Content Reference Forum (chairman) and the Coral Consortium (Vice President).

Inventor 
As an inventor, Galuten is noted for having created the first commercial drum loop ("Stayin' Alive", Bee Gees) the Enhanced CD, and has numerous patents in the areas content distribution and resolution, customer care, User Interface design, emotion based algorithmic music generation, and media aggregation and optimization.

Issued Patents

 US11328700 – Dynamic Music Modification
 US10136189 – Method and system for re-aggregation and optimization of media
 US9811799 – Distributed customer support credits
 US9159370 – Distributing media using a portable digital device compatible with optical drive devices
 US8626732 – Method and system for navigating and selecting media from large data sets
 US7624046 – Electronic music/media distribution system
 US7574434 – Method and system for navigating and selecting media from large data sets
 US7209892 – Electronic music/media distribution system
 US6918059 – Method and system for handling errors in a distributed computer system

Other Published Patents can be found at USPTO.gov

References

External links
Brothers Gibb - Interview
Song list
Albhy Galuten in the All Music Guide
Playboy Article – The Rise and Fall and Rise of the Brothers Gibb
Veracity in Journalism: https://www.hollywoodreporter.com/business/business-news/sony-seeks-patent-method-measuring-journalists-accuracy-946279/
Grammy Awards: https://www.grammy.com/artists/albhy-galuten/9142
On the iPod: https://www.nytimes.com/2022/05/10/technology/apple-ipod-phasing-out.html
More Than a Woman in Chateau D’Heuroville: https://www.udiscovermusic.com/stories/more-than-a-woman-bee-gees-feature/
Writing with Clapton on Slowhand: https://www.rockfm.fm/programas/rodrigo-garcinuno/discazo/noticias/analisis-mas-completo-slowhand-eric-clapton-por-aniversario-20221125_2418281
Drum loop in Bee Gees doc: https://cyprus-mail.com/2021/01/18/humour-and-sadness-in-bee-gees-retrospective/
Bee Gees doc: https://www.irishtimes.com/culture/film/the-irishwoman-who-wed-a-bee-gee-it-was-like-being-married-to-the-family-1.4425416
Bee Gees doc: https://www.hollywoodreporter.com/movies/movie-reviews/the-bee-gees-how-can-you-mend-a-broken-heart-film-review-4099462/
Living eyes and leaving: https://ultimateclassicrock.com/bee-gees-living-eyes-album/
Bee Gees doc: https://www.wsj.com/articles/bee-gees-hbo-documentary-essay-11607088673
Academy of Country Music Award: https://www.billboard.com/music/awards/islands-in-the-stream-acm-awards-8511122/
ACM: https://www.acmcountry.com/nominee/islands-in-the-stream
Wikipedia: https://en.wikipedia.org/wiki/Islands_in_the_Stream_(song)
Clapton in the Washington Post: https://www.irishtimes.com/culture/film/the-irishwoman-who-wed-a-bee-gee-it-was-like-being-married-to-the-family-1.4425416
Billboard #1s, 13th most successful producer: https://www.billboard.com/pro/hot-100-writers-producers-most-no-1s/
Eagles credit: https://ultimateclassicrock.com/eagles-songs-never-played-live/
Streisand’s Emotion: https://www.popmatters.com/barbra-streisand-emotion-1984-atr
Sammy Hagar, I never said goodbye: https://sleazeroxx.com/reviews/sammy-hagar-i-never-said-goodbye/
Andy Gibb, Thicker Than Water w/ Walsh: https://www.stereogum.com/2066548/the-number-ones-andy-gibbs-love-is-thicker-than-water/columns/the-number-ones/
Referenced in Layla Box Set: https://www.whereseric.com/eric-clapton-news/303-layla-and-other-assorted-love-songs-40th-anniversary-editions-due-month
Influence on Pakistani artist Mahmood Khan: https://dailytimes.com.pk/639202/mahmood-khan-only-pakistani-artist-to-record-original-songs-with-a-symphony-orchestra/
Blue Book standard: https://en.wikipedia.org/wiki/Blue_Book_(CD_standard)
Berklee: https://www.berklee.edu/berklee-today/summer-2002/On-the-Watchtower
Berklee Press: http://www.brothersgibb.org/reports-albhy-galuten.html
Berklee Career Jam: https://emamo.com/event/career-jam-2022-1/r/speaker/albhy-galuten
Jellyfish: https://en.wikipedia.org/wiki/Jellyfish_(band)
IEEE: Consortium Shared Identity Over an Enterprise Blockchain: https://ieeexplore.ieee.org/document/9691406

Living people
Record producers from New York (state)
American male composers
20th-century American composers
Grammy Award winners
1947 births
American music arrangers
Songwriters from New York (state)
American session musicians
American rock keyboardists
American rock pianists
American male pianists
20th-century American pianists
21st-century American pianists
20th-century American male musicians
21st-century American male musicians
American male songwriters